Dibble may refer to:

Dibble, a planting tool also known as a Dibber
Dibble (name)
Dibble, Oklahoma, a town in McClain County, Oklahoma, United States
Dibble Place, California, United States
British Police, a common nickname for members of the British Police Force that originated in Manchester
In Antarctica:

Dibble Bluff, a rock bluff
Dibble Glacier, a channel glacier
Dibble Basin, an underwater basin
Dibble Glacier Tongue
Dibble Iceberg Tongue
Dibble Peak